British rock band Coldplay have recorded over 178 songs  throughout their career. They were formed in London by Chris Martin (lead vocals, piano), Jonny Buckland (guitar), Guy Berryman (bass guitar), Will Champion (drums, percussion) and Phil Harvey (creative direction). With exception of the latter, all members are equally credited as songwriters of each track. They explored many music styles as the years went by, developing a sound that is considered alternative rock, alternative pop, pop rock, post-Britpop, soft rock, and pop. The band released two extended plays in the late 1990s, Safety (1998) and The Blue Room (1999), with both having characteristics of dream pop that settled them apart from future releases.

Their debut album, Parachutes, was then released in July 2000. Berryman described it as "a quiet, polite record", with Scottish band Travis and American singer Jeff Buckley serving as primary influences. It drew comparisons to Oasis and Radiohead as well, showing Coldplay's alternative rock side with moody, atmospheric songs ("Don't Panic", "Shiver" and "Yellow"). Two years later, A Rush of Blood to the Head (2002) was made available, being noted for having more guitar-driven ("God Put a Smile upon Your Face", "A Whisper") and piano-driven ("Clocks", "The Scientist") tracks than its predecessor.

Meanwhile, X&Y (2005) kept the same style, but with the addition of electronic influences and extensive use of synthesizers, having a grander scale in terms of both sound and existential themes. Lyrics on the record have also been considered to be "ruminations on Martin's doubts, fears, hopes, and loves". Their fourth album Viva la Vida or Death and All His Friends (2008), on the other hand, featured production by Brian Eno and saw Coldplay attempting to diversify their style and explore new territory. They experimented with many instruments, including electric violins, tack pianos, santoors and orchestras. Lyrically, the record had themes of life, love, death, loneliness, war and politics, being more universal than previous material. Its companion piece, Prospekt's March, featured "Lost+" a new version of "Lost!" with vocals from Jay-Z. In 2011, they released Mylo Xyloto, a concept album that follows the story of two characters in the style of a rock opera. It expanded their sound by including more upbeat tones for the first time and having a pop rock style with "modern, urban and dance" melodies such as "Every Teardrop Is a Waterfall", "Paradise" and "Princess of China", which featured vocals by Rihanna.

Ghost Stories (2014), marked a return to the melancholic, somber and stripped-down style of Parachutes, although now incorporating electronica, R&B, synth-pop and ambient influences. Martin described it as a "journey of learning about unconditional love" after his divorce with Gwyneth Paltrow. It featured contributions from Swedish producer Avicii ("A Sky Full of Stars") and longtime collaborator Jon Hopkins ("Midnight"). A year later, A Head Full of Dreams counted with production from Stargate and lyrical themes of unity, dreaming, forgiveness, healing and thankfulness. Guest appearances included Beyoncé ("Hymn for the Weekend", "Up&Up") and Tove Lo ("Fun"). In 2019, Coldplay released Everyday Life, which featured Stromae and Femi Kuti on "Arabesque". It was described as their most experimental album to date, encompassing previous influences while also dabbling in gospel, blues and classical music. This multi-style approach was kept for Music of the Spheres (2021) but leaned more towards pop sounds, since the production was handled Max Martin, while Selena Gomez ("Let Somebody Go") and BTS ("My Universe") were among the guest appearances. Aside from studio albums, the band recorded numerous extended plays; participated in film soundtracks and tribute albums; and had many unreleased songs being leaked or performed at concerts as well.

Released songs

Unreleased songs

Other songs

See also
 Coldplay discography
 Coldplay videography

Notes

References

External links
 Coldplay Official Website
 Coldplay on AllMusic

Coldplay
Coldplay